Sacred Heart Academy is an all-girls Roman Catholic high school in Louisville, Kentucky. It is located in the Roman Catholic Archdiocese of Louisville. Sacred Heart Academy was founded in 1877 and is a sponsored school of the Ursuline Sisters of Louisville. It has been named a Blue Ribbon School of Excellence twice and is an International Baccalaureate (IB) World School. It first achieved International Baccalaureate (IB) World School status in 1997. It is one of only two schools in the city and the only Catholic school in the state to offer IB.

History
Sacred Heart Academy's History began in 1858, when a request for teachers to the Ursuline Sisters of Germany came from Louisville, KY. Three young Ursulines answered the request, traveling to Louisville to teach German immigrant children at St. Martin's school. By 1859, the Sisters had established Ursuline Academy at the corner of Shelby and Chestnut streets. In 1864, the Sisters incorporated the Ursuline Society and Academy of Education. In the 1870s, more space was needed to accommodate the growing number of sisters, students and boarders. The community purchased property on Workhouse Road (later known as the Lexington Road campus). In 1877, classes began in an existing farmhouse, and the Academy of the Sacred Heart opened for grades 1 through 12. In 1924, The Academy became two schools: Sacred Heart Academy, a high school for girls, and Sacred Heart Model School, a grade school for boys and girls.

Athletics

Sacred Heart Academy has earned over 100 team state titles in its history. The on-campus athletic facility includes a gym, fitness center, five tennis courts, a regulation track, softball field, two natural grass fields and one synthetic turf field. More than 50% of the student body participates in one or more of the 15 sports offered.

Ursuline Sisters

The Ursuline Sisters of Louisville, Kentucky, an apostolic religious congregation of the Roman Catholic Church, rooted in the spirit and tradition of Saint Angela Merici. Teaching Christian Living is the corporate ministry of the Ursuline Sisters.

Core values

Sacred Heart Academy teaches the Ursuline Core Values of community, reverence, service, and leadership. Community is taught over the course of students' freshman year, reverence their sophomore, service their junior, and leadership their senior.

Notable alumni 

 Grace Berger (born 1999), college basketball player
 Caroline Burckle (born 1986), Olympic swimmer
 Susan Duncan, academic administrator and lawyer
 Leigh Ann Fetter (born 1969), Olympic swimmer
 Brooke Forde (born 1999), Olympic swimmer
 Mary T. Meagher (born 1964), Olympic swimmer
 Anne Northup (born 1948), politician

Notes and references

External links
 

Girls' schools in Kentucky
Roman Catholic schools in Louisville, Kentucky
Educational institutions established in 1877
International Baccalaureate schools in Kentucky
1877 establishments in Kentucky
Catholic secondary schools in Kentucky
Ursuline schools
High schools in Louisville, Kentucky